Wilhelm Jakobs was a German railway engineer and construction advisor.

Life

Early years and education 
Wilhelm Jakobs was born on 10 February 1858 in Diezenkausen as the eldest child of Wilhelm Jakobs (1832–1913) and Luise, born Luise Simon. His father, who was a respected farmer and blacksmith, took public office, possessed poetic inclinations, and was known to the foresters as a "poet behind the plow."

The young Wilhelm attended elementary school in Waldbröl, and followed the higher citizen school. Since 1874 he visited the real department of the Friedrich-Wilhelm Gymnasium in Cologne, until his graduation on 17 July 1877. On October 9, 1877, he enrolled in mechanical engineering at the Berlin Gewerbeakademie (the later Technical University). On 22 November 1882 he passed the first state examination for mechanical engineering.

After various practical activities in railway workshops and military service as a one-year volunteer at the railroad regiment, he then worked on locomotive construction in Hanover. In the years 1886 to 1888, he passed the locomotive examination and from 16th July 1888 was a Railroad official at the railway directorate in Cologne.

On 28. August 1895 he married Else Luyken and founded his first household in St. Johann. With Else, he had a total of 5 sons, who were born during the years of 1896 through 1905. In 1896 Wilhelm was called back to Cologne, but in 1900 he retired from civil service after he became the head of the Rastatt wagon factory. On 10. April 1901, the Imperial Patent Office granted him the patent for a "passenger car consisting of several articulated sections, two of which each rest on a common bogie with the ends facing each other". The latter, named after him the Jakobs bogie is used today by many railcars and multiple units all over the world. In this construction, two adjacent car body ends of railway vehicles are based on a common bogie from which effort and weight can be saved.

In the spring of 1914, the Association of German wagon factories was founded in Berlin. Jakobs became one of the two managing directors and moved with his family to Berlin-Dahlem.

First World War 
Wilhelm Jakobs advanced at the beginning of the First World War on the second day of mobilization as Captain of the reserve and Company Leader of the Reserve Railroad Company 9, and in the middle of August with his company Belgium where the train station Libramont was restored.

From September to November 1914, the war railway bridges over the Mesh at Charleville Mezieres, about the Scheldt at Ename and at Audenarde built, the railway Sodeghem Kortrijk restored with stations and made operational. Then the train was from Roeselare after Moorslede and Ypern put into operation. At the turn of the year 1914/15 were the railways Torhout –  Ostend and Thourout Ypres taken over and expanded. At Ostend the heavy guns were brought to the dunes and the lighthouse was set up for blasting. In April 1915, Wilhelm Jakobs led the railway business to Attack on Ypres and during the subsequent battles. In July 1915 he became the 5th. Army (Crown Prince Army) transferred and appointed chief of the Baudirektion of this army; on 30 November 1915 he was promoted to major in reserve.

In the winter of 1915/16, with the subordinate tram companies and temporarily assigned troop departments, the supply and attack routes to attack Verdun in the area of the 5th Army prepared and maintained during the time of the attack and the fighting before Verdun. Also was started by repairing the locks, the Maas canal after Verdun to become operational again in the autumn of 1916, Wilhelm Jakobs, the Iron Cross II and I. Class and that Ritterkreuz I was recalled from the field to re-enter the leadership of the Association of German Wagon Factories, as the need for new railway wagons became necessary for the war. At the same time Wilhelm was also active in the vehicle committee until its dissolution.

The further development of the war filled him with increasing bitterness and anxiety towards those who gave the All-German Association its far-reaching war aims. He supported the appearance of the so-called 1917/18 Fatherland Party. On 28 October 1918, a few days before the end of the monarchy, he was awarded the honor of "Royal Building Council". As "Jakob's Building Council" he remained in the memory of those in Waldbröler after death.

The lost war, the revolution and the Versailles Treaty hit him hardly. Still in December 1918 he participated in the founding of the German National People's Party he also ran for office at parliamentary elections without gaining a seat. In March 1921, the Association of German wagon factories was dissolved and the association of German wagon factories was founded and also dissolved in October 1923 and lay of Wilhelm Jakobs. He already was in the age of 65, but forced retirement made him hard to deal with for a long time. The 1920s production based on his invention Jakob joint car was a certain satisfaction on which he occasionally participated.

Death 
In October 1926, Wilhelm Jakobs sold his house in Berlin-Dahlen and moved with his wife to Bergstrabe in Bensheim, but moved again in 1931 his home village Diezenkausen. In 1939, at the age of 80, Wilhelm Jakobs sold the house in Diezenkausen and moved with his wife to a pension in Bonn where he succumbed to a stroke on 3 February 1942.

Further reading 
 (German) Karl Sachs: Elektrische Triebfahrzeuge. Huber, Frauenfeld 1953.

References

External links 
(German) Biography Wilhelm Jacobs

German railway mechanical engineers
Train drivers
1858 births
1942 deaths